The Landowners (Danish: Grundejerne) is a local political party set in Solrød Municipality.

History
The Landowners was founded in March, 2013 by Eilif Nørgaard. The founding of the party was well received by local politicians from both Conservative People's Party and Social Democrats.

The party ran with five candidates in 2013, and got 9.4% of the votes in Solrød Municipality, giving them two seats in the municipal council. Jan Færch and Eilif Nørgaard were the two elected Landowners.

Election results

Municipal elections

References

Liberal parties in Denmark
Political parties established in 2013
2013 establishments in Denmark
Regionalist parties